The 1993 Central American and Caribbean Championships in Athletics were held at the Estadio Pascual Guerrero in Cali, Colombia between 30 July − 1 August.

Medal summary

Men's events

Women's events

Medal table

See also
1993 in athletics (track and field)

External links
Men Results – GBR Athletics
Women Results – GBR Athletics

Central American and Caribbean Championships in Athletics
Central American and Caribbean Championships
Sport in Cali
International athletics competitions hosted by Colombia
Central